Bhale Rangadu is a 1969 Indian Telugu-language drama film, produced by N. N. Bhatt and directed by T. Rama Rao. It stars Akkineni Nageswara Rao and Vanisri, with music composed by K. V. Mahadevan. Released on 14 August 1969, the film was a critical and commercial success.

Plot 
Ranga (Akkineni Nageswara Rao) a jovial loaf, lives with his sister Lachamma (Pushpa Kumari) & niece Ganga (Vijayalalitha). He credits prattle of an astrologer (Allu Ramalingaiah) that a wealthy woman couples him along with Rs.30 Lakhs of property. Besides, Zamindar Raja Shekaram (Nagabhushanam) a millionaire whose only heir is granddaughter Radha (Vanisri). Once Radha is acquainted with Ranga in an accident when she sweets on him. Meanwhile, Zamindar's malicious Diwanji (Gummadi) ploys to knit Radha with his imbecile son Papai (Padmanabham) when he is badly humiliated. Keeping the grudge, Diwanji intrigues by indicting Zamindar for the crime of slaughtering his servant Narasaiah (Dhulipala) which makes Zamindar lose his consciousness. Just as, Diwanji intimidates Radha to wed Papai above she is surrounded by several relatives who plot to usurp her wealth. During that plight, Ranga consoles her and makes a game plan. Soon, he civilises, with the help of Radha and arrives as Zamindar's friend's grandson and starts teasing the blackguards. Later, Radha falls for Ranga even Papai & Ganga are infatuated and he too teams up with them. Parallelly, Ranga makes Zamindar normal and uncovers the truth of Narasaiah's existence in the clutches of Diwanji. At last, Ranga ceases the traitors. Finally, the movie ends on a happy note with the marriage of Ranga & Radha.

Cast 

Akkineni Nageswara Rao as Ranga
Vanisri as Radha
Gummadi as Diwanji
Satyanarayana as Seshu
Allu Ramalingaiah as Astrologer
Dhulipala as Narasaiah
Nagabhushanam as Zamindar Raja Shekaram
Padmanabham as Papai
Raavi Kondala Rao as R. K. Rao
Sakshi Ranga Rao as Gumastha Rajanna
K. V. Chalam as Andalamma's son
Potti Prasad as Subbai
Bheema Raju as Jaggadu
Suryakantham as Andalamma
Vijaya Lalitha as Ganga
Pushpa Kumari as Lachamma
Sarathi as Ranga's secretary in the dream sequence

Soundtrack 

Music was composed by K. V. Mahadevan.

Reception 
Vijaya of Visalaandhra in her review dated 17 August 1969 called Bhale Rangadu an "entertaining film," whilst appreciating the performances of Nageswara Rao and Vanisri.

References

External links 
 

1969 drama films
1969 films
Films directed by T. Rama Rao
Films scored by K. V. Mahadevan
Indian drama films